The 2017–18 Washington Huskies women's basketball team represented University of Washington during the 2017–18 NCAA Division I women's basketball season. The Huskies were led by first-year head coach Jody Wynn. The Huskies play their home games at Alaska Airlines Arena at Hec Edmundson Pavilion in Seattle, Washington as members of the Pac-12 Conference. They finished the season 7–23, 1–17 in Pac-12 play to finish in last place. They lost in the first round of the Pac-12 women's basketball tournament to California.

Previous season
The 2016–17 Huskies finished the 2016–17 season 29–6, 15–3 in Pac-12 play.

Roster

Schedule

|-
!colspan=12 style="background:#363c74; color:#e8d3a2;"| Non-conference regular season

|-
!colspan=12 style="background:#363c74; color:#e8d3a2;"| Pac-12 regular season

|-
!colspan=9 style="background:#363c74;" | Pac-12 Women's Tournament

Rankings

See also
2017–18 Washington Huskies men's basketball team

References

Washington Huskies women's basketball seasons
Washington Huskies women
Washington Huskies basketball, women
Washington Huskies basketball, women
Washington Huskies basketball, women
Washington Huskies basketball, women